São Sebastião Lighthouse is a lighthouse in the São Sebastião fortress at the southeastern end of Ana Chaves Bay in São Tomé, capital of São Tomé and Príncipe. The lighthouse is a 6 metres high white round tower with a red lantern. It was built in 1928. Its focal height is 14 metres.

See also

List of lighthouses in São Tomé and Príncipe

References

External links

Lighthouses in São Tomé and Príncipe
Buildings and structures in São Tomé
Portuguese colonial architecture in São Tomé and Príncipe